Erratic may refer to:
 Erratic, a project of music artist Jan Robbe
 Glacial erratic, a piece of rock that differs from the size and type of rock native to the area in which it rests
 Erratic ant (Tapinoma erraticum), a species of ant